Aviator Sports and Events Center is a sports and events center in Floyd Bennett Field, Brooklyn, New York City. Operating as a concessionaire of National Park Service, Aviator has refurbished four historic aircraft hangars and surrounding grounds in partnership with the NPS.  The area includes 175,000 square feet of indoor sports and event space along with adjoining outdoor turf fields and free parking for 2,000 cars. Aviator provides a variety of sports and leagues play including basketball, football, gymnastics, ice hockey, ice skating, lacrosse, soccer and volleyball. Activities such as parties, field trips, camps, and birthday celebrations are held at the facility.

The NPS and Aviator formed a partnership in 2003, and the facility opened in 2006. By combining several of Floyd Bennett Field's hangars, they created one of the largest sports complexes in the country.

Facilities

The Aviator Complex contains ice skating rinks within two of the hangars.

Aviator's Sports Facilities include:
Two synthetic turf outdoor fields
Outdoor event space
Two indoor ice rinks
 field house with hardwood floor, climbing wall and turf field
 Gymnastics Center
 Fitness center
Arcade
Food court
Indoor and Outdoor Sports Bar
Full catering and food service
Large corporate meeting and private events rooms

Aviator Sports and Events Center hosts programs and activities including camps, birthday parties, field trips, and sporting meets. The complex also hosts sporting events and shows throughout the year, and the occasional air show.

Once inside the indoor entrance to the center, an entire inner wall tribute several stories high is dedicated to the history of Aeronautics which took place on the site of the sports facility and the people of flight who made Bennett Field famous. These include Wiley Post, the first pilot to solo around the world, who flew around the world from the field and returned to it in 7 days 19 hours and 49 minutes in July 1933; and billionaire Howard Hughes, who flew  around the world from Floyd Bennett Field in July 1938 and returned to it with a crew of four men in 3 days, 19 hours, 8 minutes, 10 seconds to collect important navigational data.

Events
Since 2011, Aviator Sports and Events Center has become a prominent location for obstacle races and expos in New York City. Events that have taken place through a rental agreement include: Rugged Maniac, Big Bounce America, Night Nation Run, Sneaker Exit, UniverSoul Circus, St. Jude's Kids for Kids Fundraiser, Tomato Battle, Civilian Military Combine, weddings, and more.

Strategic relationships
 Concessionaire of National Park Service , servicing Floyd Bennett Field area of Gateway National Recreation Area,

Tenants
ASA College Soccer
Berkeley College Men's & Women's Soccer teams
Bishop Ford High School Football & Soccer teams
Brooklyn Lacrosse Club
Blau Weiss Gottschee Soccer Club
Dutch Total Soccer
FA Euro, member of the Premier Development League
Medgar Evers College Men's & Women's Soccer teams
Mendy Kolko Football
Metro Fighting Moose Hockey Team
New York Empire, member of the American Ultimate Disc League
New York Aviators Hockey Team
New York Sharks, member of the Independent Women's Football League
NYU-Poly Men's & Women's Soccer & Women's Lacrosse
SABA Youth Soccer
St. Ann's School Soccer
Xavier High School Football and Soccer
Multiple semi pro football teams

Historical footage 

 Howard Hughes rare airplane silent black and white video footage taking off with his team on his historical round the flight from Floyd Bennett Field
 Howard Hughes rare silent black and white video footage landing at Floyd Bennett Field and being interviewed after a 10½ hour nonstop transatlantic flight

References

External links
 Gateway National Recreation Area website
 Aviator Sports and Events Center website
 CrossFit Floyd Bennett Field

New York Riveters
American football venues in New York City
Basketball venues in New York City
College soccer venues in the United States
Gymnastics venues in New York City
High school football venues in the United States
Indoor arenas in New York City
Indoor ice hockey venues in New York City
Lacrosse venues in New York (state)
Soccer venues in New York City
Sports venues in Brooklyn
Ultimate (sport) venues
Volleyball venues in New York City
1931 establishments in New York City
1972 disestablishments in New York (state)
Boxing venues in New York City